Aynalı can refer to:

 Aynalı, Çermik
 Aynalı, Düzce